Raymond 'Ray' Sharp is a former badminton player from England.

Career
Sharp was a two times national champion after winning the singles at the English National Badminton Championships in 1968 and 1969.

Sharp represented England and won a bronze medal in the men's singles, at the 1970 British Commonwealth Games in Edinburgh, Scotland.

References 

1945 births
English male badminton players
Badminton players at the 1970 British Commonwealth Games
Commonwealth Games bronze medallists for England
Living people
Commonwealth Games medallists in badminton
Medallists at the 1970 British Commonwealth Games